
Gmina Tuczępy is a rural gmina (administrative district) in Busko County, Świętokrzyskie Voivodeship, in south-central Poland.

Villages
Gmina Tuczępy contains the villages and settlements of Brzozówka, Chałupki, Dobrów, Góra, Grzymała, Januszkowice, Jarosławice, Kargów, Nieciesławice, Niziny, Podlesie, Rzędów, Sachalin, Sieczków, Tuczępy and Wierzbica.

Neighbouring gminas
Gmina Tuczępy is bordered by the gminas of Gnojno, Oleśnica, Rytwiany, Staszów, Stopnica and Szydłów.

References
Polish official population figures 2006

Tuczepy
Busko County